Carvalhodrymus is a genus of bugs in the family Rhyparochromidae. the type species, C. elegans, is found in Ghana and Cameroon.

References

External links 

 Carvalhodrymus elegans at lygaeoidea.speciesfile.org

Pentatomomorpha genera
Drymini